The following is a timeline of the Premiership of Narendra Modi from his inauguration as Prime Minister of India on 26 May 2014 till now. The following are the highlights of the major events that took place under his premiership.

First term

2014

May 2014 
26 May – Modi Sworn in as 14th Prime Minister of India at the Rashtrapati Bhawan, New Delhi.
27 May – Modi held bilateral talks with each visiting head of state/head of government of eight SAARC nation plus Mauritius at Hyderabad House, New Delhi. This event was dubbed as mini SAARC summit in the media.

June 2014 
15–16 June – Modi made his first foreign visit to Bhutan following an invitation by King Jigme Khesar Namgyel Wangchuck and Tobgay. The visit was called by the media as a "charm offensive" that would also seek to check Bhutan-China relations that had recently been formalised. He also sought to build business ties, including a hydro-electric deal and inaugurated the India-funded Supreme Court of Bhutan building in Thimpu. While talking about the visit, Modi said that Bhutan was a "natural choice" for his first foreign destination because of the "unique and special relationship" the two countries shared. He added that he was looking forward to nurture and further strengthen India's special relations with Bhutan. His entourage included Foreign Minister Sushma Swaraj, National Security Adviser Ajit Doval and Foreign Secretary Sujatha Singh. He was further set to discuss the insurgency in Northeast India, and China.
30 June – Modi went to the Satish Dhawan Space Centre (SHAR) in Sriharikota, Andhra Pradesh to witness the launch of PSLV C23 carrying French satellite SPOT-7 along with other smaller foreign satellites. He also expressed his intention of funding a unique SAARC satellite for the use of all South Asian nations.

July 2014 

13–16 July – In July 2014, he visited Brazil for his first multilateral visit, the 6th BRICS summit was held at the north-eastern beach city of Fortaleza. In the Fortaleza summit the group have agreed to establish a financial institution rivaling the western dominated World Bank and IMF, The bank would be named the New Development Bank as suggested by the Indian side but Modi government failed to bag the bank's headquarter for New Delhi, which would be located in Shanghai, China. Later the BRICS leader also attended an event in Brasilia where they met the UNASUR heads of government. At the same time, the Ministry of External Affairs added Spanish to its list of available languages, which the Hindustan Times read as "indicative of the government's intent to go beyond Europe, Asia and the US to forge diplomatic and trade ties with Latin American nations." He travelled there via Germany.
 16 July – Modi met the Brazilian President, Dilma Rousseff on the sidelines of the 6th BRICS summit in Brasilia, Brazil, in July 2014.

August 2014 
28 August - The Pradhan Mantri Jan Dhan Yojana was formally launched.

September 2014 
1 to 2 September  – Two day trip by Modi to Japan. He met Mr. Shinzo Abe meet at Akasaka Palace, in Tokyo, Japan.
 5 September – Modi meets the Australian Prime Minister, Tony Abbott on his State Visit to India and holds talks on bilateral, regional and other important issues.
 8 September – PM visits Jammu and Kashmir; reviews situation in flood affected areas.
 10 September – Modi meets Emeritus Senior Minister (ESM) of Singapore, Mr. Goh Chok Tong
 11 September – Modi chairs a high-level meeting on Mission Swacch Bharat; calls for making it a mass movement and linking it to economic activity.
 17 September – Modi and Chinese President, Xi Jinping witness signing of 3 MoUs in Ahmedabad, Gujarat.
 19 September – Modi meets Mr. Bill Gates and Mrs. Melinda Gates
 24 September – Modi was at the ISRO headquarter in Bangalore to witness the martian orbit insertion of Mars Orbiter Mission.
 25 September – Modi unveils the global ‘Make in India’ initiative.
 26 September – Five day trip to US invited by Barack Obama, included attending the sixty-ninth session of the United Nations General Assembly in New York
 27 September – Modi addresses the United Nations General Assembly.
 28 September – PM addresses Indian Community at Madison Square Garden in New York; announces sweeping changes in PIO and OCI schemes.
 29 September – Modi addresses the Council on Foreign Relations in New York City
 30 September –  Prime Minister, Shri Narendra Modi visits Martin Luther King Memorial

October 2014

November 2014

December 2014

2015

January 2015

February 2015

March 2015

April 2015

May 2015 
 9 May – Modi launches Jan Suraksha Schemes.
 17 May – Trip to China
 18 May – Trip to Mongolia
 19 May – Trip to South Korea
 25 May – Modi addresses a rally in Mathura.
 26 May – Modi launches DD Kisan.

June 2015 
 6 June - Trip to Bangladesh
 7 June - On behalf of Atal Bihari Vajpayee, PM Narendra Modi receives the Bangladesh Liberation War honour.
 9 June - Assesses healthcare initiatives.
 11 June – Bangladesh Liberation War Honour presented to Atal Bihari Vajpayee was handed over to family members by PM Narendra Modi.
 21 June – 1st Yoga Day Celebrated, led by PM Narendra Modi in New Delhi. This gathering was held at Raj Path, New Delhi, India.
24 June - Launches Pradhan Mantri Awas Yojana for providing houses for rural and urban low and mid income group.

July 2015 
 6 July – Trip to Uzbekistan.
 8 July – Trip to Kazakhstan.
 10 July – Trip to Russia to attend BRICS and SCO summit in Ufa, Russia.
 13 July - PM Narendra Modi's visit to Tajikistan

August 2015

September 2015

October 2015

November 2015

December 2015

2016

January 2016

February 2016 

 28 February 2016 - PM Modi first talked of the target of doubling farmers' income at a farmer's rally in Uttar Pradesh.

March 2016

April 2016

May 2016 
1 May: Launches Pradhan Mantri Ujjwala Yojana for providing free LPG connection to poor women.

June 2016

July 2016

August 2016

September 2016

October 2016

November 2016 
 8 November – Announcement of Demonetization of Indian currency denominations of Rs 500 and 1000.

December 2016

2017

January 2017

February 2017

March 2017

April 2017

May 2017

June 2017

July 2017

August 2017 
 The BJP Government formulated the Triple talaq Ban after 100 cases of instant triple talaq in the country since the Supreme Court judgement in August 2017.

September 2017

October 2017

November 2017

December 2017 
25 December - PM Modi inaugurates Delhi Metro's magenta line, addresses public meeting in Noida
28 December – Lok Sabha passed The Muslim Women (Protection of Rights on Marriage) Bill, 2017. The bill make instant triple talaq (talaq-e-biddah) in any form – spoken, in writing or by electronic means such as email, SMS and WhatsApp illegal and void, with up to three years in jail for the husband. MPs from RJD, AIMIM, BJD, AIADMK and AIML opposed the bill, calling it arbitrary in nature and a faulty proposal, while Congress supported the Bill tabled in Lok Sabha by law minister Ravi Shankar Prasad. 19 amendments were moved in Lok Sabha but all were rejected.

2018

January 2018

February 2018

March 2018

April 2018

May 2018

June 2018

July 2018

August 2018

September 2018

October 2018

November 2018

December 2018

2019

January 2019 
3 January - PM Modi attended 106th Science Congress. 
8 January – India's lower house of parliament approves a bill that would grant residency and citizenship rights to non-Muslim immigrants Hindus, Sikhs, Buddhists, Jains, Parsis and Christians from three Muslim-majority countries - Bangladesh, Pakistan and Afghanistan - eligible for Indian citizenship. the Bill excludes Muslims.

February 2019 
3 February - PM Modi launches multiple development projects in Srinagar. PM Modi lays foundation stone and inaugurates development projects in Jammu. PM Modi lays foundation stone and inaugurates development projects in Leh
11 February - PM Modi takes part in the 3 billionth meal of Akshaya Patra mid-day meal programme in Vrindavan
14 February – Pulwama suicide attack resulting in death of 40 CRPF personnel while Narendra Modi was shooting for Discovery in Jim Corbett National park.
26 February – Authorizes air strike on Balakot terrorist camp in Pakistan.
29 February – Inaugurates the National War memorial.

March 2019

April 2019

Second term

2019

May 2019 
23 May – Wins for the second time as Member of Parliament from the city of Varanasi. 
30 May – Sworn in for the second time as the 15th Prime Minister of India at the Rashtrapati Bhawan, New Delhi.

June 2019 
21 June – The government introduced a fresh The Muslim Women (Protection of Rights on Marriage) Bill, 2019 bill in the Lok Sabha on 21 June 2019.

July 2019 
25-30 July – The Muslim Women (Protection of Rights on Marriage) Bill, 2019 bill which will ban Triple talaq was passed by Lok Sabha on 25 July 2019 and then by Rajya Sabha on 30 July 2019, and received the presidential ascent soon thereafter. The bill stands to be retrospectively effective from 19 September 2018.

August 2019 
5 August – Home Minister Amit Shah moved a presidential resolution to scrap Article 370 in the Rajya Sabha, and also a bill to reorganize the state, creating the new union territories of Jammu and Kashmir and Ladakh. The Jammu and Kashmir reorganisation act became effective from 31 October 2019.

September 2019

October 2019

November 2019 
9 November – India's Supreme Court rules to hand over the disputed site (2.77 acres) to a government-created trust to built the Ram Janmabhoomi temple, it also ruled to the government to provide an alternate 5 acres of land to the Sunni Waqf Board to built a mosque.

December 2019 
11 December – Rajya Sabha passes the Citizenship Amendment Bill, providing a path to Indian citizenship for refugees from Pakistan, Bangladesh and Afghanistan who are the religious minorities (Hindus, Sikhs, Buddhists, Jains, Parsis and Christians) in the three countries and who came to India before 31 December 2014.  The law also reduced the naturalization period for the listed religious minorities from these countries from 11 years to 5 years.

2020

January 2020

February 2020

March 2020

April 2020

May 2020 
12 May – Prime Minister announced an economic stimulus package of 20 trillion rupees, which is equivalent to 10% of India's gross domestic product, during the COVID-19 pandemic.
15 May – Prime Minister gave the clarification and motto of Atmanirbhar Bharat to strong economy of the nation.
22 May – Prime Minister made project to counter the Amphan cyclone in West Bengal and Orissa and also visited the affected areas.

June 2020 

16 June – Prime Minister held virtual meeting with Chief ministers of all states regarding the Unlock-1 in India.
18 June – Prime Minister launches auction process of 41 coal blocks for commercial mining. 
19 June – Prime Minister held meeting regarding India-China border dispute.

July 2020 

 3 July – Prime Minister visits to Nimu, Ladakh to see border situation.
15 July - On the occasion of World Youth Skills Day, PM Modi exhorts youth to Skill, Reskill and Upskill
17 July - PM Modi delivers keynote address at United Nations Economic and Social Council session
22 July - PM Modi attends the India Ideas Summit
23 July - PM Modi lays foundation stone for Manipur Water Supply Project via video conferencing
27 July - PM Modi launches High Throughput COVID testing facilities at Kolkata, Mumbai and Noida
 30 July – Prime Minister along with Mauritius prime minister, Pravind Jugnauth inaugurates new parliament building of Mauritius.

August 2020 

 1 August – Prime Minister addresses Grand Finale of Smart India Hackathon 2020.
 14 August – PM Modi becomes the longest-serving non-Congress Prime Minister.
 5 August – Prime Minister prays at Hanuman Garhi Temple in Ayodhya, and then held the bhoomipoojan in Ram Mandir in Ayodhya.

September 2020 

 20 September – The Rajya Sabha approved three farm reform bills. 
 27 September – The President of India, Ram Nath Kovind gave his assent on the approved three farm reform bills.

October 2020

November 2020

December 2020 

 12 December - PM Modi delivers inaugural address at FICCI's 93rd Annual General Meeting
15 December - PM Modi lays foundation stone of multiple development initiatives in Kutch
17 December - PM Modi, Bangladesh PM hold virtual bilateral meeting
18 December - PM Modi addresses Kisan Sammelan held in Madhya Pradesh
21 December - PM Modi holds Virtual Summit with PM Nguyen Xuan Phuc of Vietnam
22 December - PM Modi awarded the Legion of Merit by the United States of America. PM Modi addresses Centenary Celebrations of Aligarh Muslim University
24 December - PM Modi addresses centenary celebrations of Visva Bharati University, Shantiniketan
25 December - PM Modi releases instalment of financial benefit under PM Kisan Samman Nidhi
 28 December - PM Modi flags off 100th Kisan Rail from Maharashtra to West Bengal
 29 December - PM Modi inaugurates New Bhaupur-New Khurja section of Eastern Dedicated Freight Corridor
 31 December - PM Modi lays Foundation Stone of AIIMS at Rajkot

2021

January 2021 

 1 January - PM Modi lays foundation stone of Light House projects (LHPs) across six states
 2 January - PM Modi lays foundation stone of the permanent campus of IIM Sambalpur in Odisha

February 2021 
 14 February - PM Modi launched five developmental projects in Kerala, projects worth crores in Tamil Nadu
 18 February - PM Modi inaugurates road projects worth Rs 7,700 crore in Assam.

March 2021 
 9 March - PM virtually inaugurated the India-Bangladesh Friendship Bridge (Maitri Setu)
 9 March - PM lays the foundation stone for 8 infrastructure projects together worth ₹ 3,518 crore.
 15 March - PM Modi held a video-conference meeting of all chief ministers in response to the recent spike of COVID-19 cases across India.

April 2021 
 7 April - PM Modi held his annual interaction with students Pariksha Pe Charcha
 11 April - PM Modi launches Tika Utsav (Vaccine Festival) emphasizing on testing and awareness and urged every eligible person to get vaccinated.

May 2021

June 2021

July 2021

August 2021

References

External sources 

 

Modi administration
Indian history timelines
Narendra Modi-related lists